Motlow may refer to

 Motlow State Community College, a junior college begun in Moore County, Tennessee
 Motlow Tunnel, a passageway in the Tennessee State Capitol
 J. Reagor Motlow (1898–1978), American businessman and politician
 Lem Motlow (1869–1947), American businessman and politician
 Tom Motlow, 1900–01 basketball player for the Vanderbilt University Commodores